Nehor was the name of the Nephite founder of an apostate sect mentioned in the Book of Mormon, around 90 BC. In opposition to the Church of God headed by Alma the Younger, Nehor zealously preached the following doctrines:

Priests and teachers should be paid for their preaching and hold a privileged status.
There will be a universal salvation for all mankind. .
There is no need for repentance.

Nehor's style of evangelizing was confrontational and led to violence. He began arguing with a man named Gideon, who was a member of the Church of God. During the exchange, Nehor became angry and killed Gideon with a sword. Nehor was then taken to face murder charges before Alma the Younger, High Priest of the Church of God, but also Chief Judge of the land. Alma condemns Nehor to death for the murder of Gideon and accuses him of priestcraft.  Before his execution, Nehor was taken to the top of hill Manti and "caused" to recant his teachings before suffering an "ignominious death".

Later groups of Nehor adherents built synagogues and formed the cities of Ammonihah and Jerusalem. The Amalekites, for example, lived among the Lamanites and were granted freedom of religion from the Lamanite king.

The followers of Nehor have a far reaching impact on events during the life of Alma the Younger and his children. The divisions created by Nehor's sect deepened after his execution and lead to his followers violently persecuting the Church of God.  These divisions were later used by Amlici to gain power and force a popular election to anoint himself king. After losing the election he rallied his followers called "Amlicites", allied with the Lamanites, and started a civil war resulting in the death of tens of thousands. The Amlicites joined with Amulonites and Zoramites, who were other renegade Nephites, in an effort to destroy the Nephite nation — but they ultimately failed.

Another group of Nehor adherents, who remained loyal to the Nephite government, lived in the city of Ammonihah where the Chief Judge of the city ordered the burning of sacred books and the massacre of women and children who believed in their words. The city was subsequently destroyed by the Lamanites.

See also
 Korihor
 Plan 10 from Outer Space
 Universalism and the Latter Day Saint movement

References

Further reading

Book of Mormon people